Costly State Verification (CSV) is an approach in contract theory that considers a contract design problem in which verification (or disclosure) of enterprise performance is costly and a lender has to pay a monitoring cost. 

A central result of CSV approach is that it is generally optimal to commit to a partial, state-contingent disclosure rule. Robert M. Townsend (1979) has shown that under few strong assumptions the optimal financing mechanism is a standard debt contract for which there is no disclosure of the debtor's performance as long as debt is honored, but there is full disclosure (verification) in case of default.

Viewed from the CSV perspective, the main function of bankruptcy institutions is to establish a clear inventory of all assets and liabilities and to assess the net value of the firm. 

The standard setup for financial contracting problems in CSV framework involves two risk-neutral agents, a wealth-constrained entrepreneur with an investment project, and a wealthy investor with capital available. The fixed capital invested in the project generates random cash flow at future time t with probability distribution over the possible range of profits. The entrepreneur has private information about realized cash flows from the project, but it can credibly disclose them to the investor by incurring certain cost. 

The solution to this problem should provide ex-ante optimal contract structure which specify in which scenario realized cash flow should be audited and certified.

With no audit the entrepreneur would never be able to raise any money from investor since rational investor anticipates that the entrepreneur will lie about realized profit to avoid paying back to the investor. 

However, in CSV framework regulated mandatory periodic disclosure of entrepreneurial performance is not efficient and imposes excessive disclosure costs.
The optimal financial contract in CSV model gives the creditor the right to all assets of the project in the event of default at fixed bankruptcy cost that must be incurred to collect the proceeds.

The results that standard debt contract is optimal does not hold in case of multiple investors or multiple risky projects undertaken by the entrepreneur.

See also
Complete contract
Contract theory (Economics)
Agency cost

References
Townsend, R.M., 1979. Optimal contracts and competitive markets with costly state verification. Journal of Economic Theory 21(2), 265–293.
Gale, Douglas and Hellwig, Martin (1985), "Incentive-Compatible Debt Contracts I: The One-Period Problem", Review of Economic Studies 52, 647-64
Bolton, Patrick and Dewatripont, Mathias. Contract Theory. MIT Press, 2005.

Game theory
Asymmetric information